Keramat or Karamat is a district in Buol Regency, Sulawesi, Indonesia. It covers 153.1 km2. As of the 2010 census the population was 8,296, but by the 2020 Census this had risen to 9,734. The administrative centre is at Busak.

References

Districts of Central Sulawesi